Uta no Prince-sama is an otome game media franchise centered on the fictional Japanese idol boy band STARISH (stylized as ST☆RISH), starting with the release of the first game in 2010. Music for the series is managed by B-Green for the games and King Records for the anime. All songs in the franchise were produced by Elements Garden. All music released is credited under the characters' names.

The voice actors for STARISH consist of Takuma Terashima as Otoya Ittoki, Mamoru Miyano as Tokiya Ichinose, Junichi Suwabe as Ren Jinguji, Kenichi Suzumura as Masato Hijirikawa, Kisho Taniyama as Natsuki Shinomiya, and Hiro Shimono as Syo Kurusu. Kohsuke Toriumi, who plays as Cecil Aijima, was included in the group starting from the second season of the anime and the game Uta no Prince-sama: Debut.

The game Uta no Prince-sama: All Star and the second season of the anime series, Uta no Prince-sama: Maji Love 2000%, introduced a rival idol group, Quartet Night (stylized as QUARTET NIGHT), with the characters voiced by Tatsuhisa Suzuki as Ranmaru Kurosaki, Shouta Aoi as Ai Mikaze, Showtaro Morikubo as Reiji Kotobuki, and Tomoaki Maeno as Camus. STARISH and Quartet Night have performed as two subgroups: Day Dream, consisting of Otoya (Terashima), Natsuki (Taniyama), Ren (Suwabe), Syo (Shimono), Reiji (Morikubo), and Ranmaru (Suzuki); and Night Dream, consisting of Tokiya (Miyano), Masato (Suzumura), Cecil (Toriumi), Ai (Aoi), and Camus (Maeno).

A third group, HEAVENS (stylized as HE★VENS), was introduced beginning with the second season of the anime series, consisting of Hikaru Midorikawa as Eiichi Otori, Daisuke Ono as Kira Sumeragi, Tsubasa Yonaga as Nagi Mikado, Ryōhei Kimura as Yamato Hyuga, Yuma Uchida as Eiji Otori, Hidenori Takahashi as Van Kiryuin, and Daiki Yamashita as Shion Amakusa.

Albums

Extended plays

Compilation albums

Soundtrack albums

Drama CD albums

Radio show albums

Musical theatre albums

Singles

Character singles

Other charted songs

Tours

Concert participation
 Animelo Summer Live 2012: Infinity 8.26 (2012)
 Animelo Summer Live 2013: Flag Nine 8.25 (2013)

Notes

References 

Anime soundtracks
Video game music discographies
Film and television discographies